Christoph Vogelsang (born 26 July 1985) is a German professional poker player from Sassenberg, Münster.

Early life

Vogelsang was raised in Sassenberg, Münster. He studied economics at Witten/Herdecke University and the London School of Economics. Vogelsang currently resides in London and is a Christian.

Poker career
In 2010, Vogelsang made several $10 deposits into online poker. Within 4 weeks he was playing $5000 No Limit Hold'em online cash games.

In October 2013, Vogelsang cashed in his first major tournament, the EPT London £50,000 Super High Roller where he finished 3rd for £383,200 ($621,321). He participated in the 2014 $1,000,000 Big One for One Drop finishing 3rd for $4,480,001. In June 2017, he won the 2017 Super High Roller Bowl and earned $6,000,000.

As of March 2020, Vogelsang's live tournament earnings exceed $25,000,000.

Online poker
Vogelsang played under the alias Tight-Man1 on Full Tilt Poker where he earned over $1,900,000 and under the alias 26071985 on PokerStars where he has earned over $600,000.

References

External links
 Christoph Vogelsang Hendon Mob profile

German poker players
Living people
1985 births